The Philadelphia Marathon (aka the Philadelphia Independence Marathon) is an annual marathon sporting event held in Philadelphia, Pennsylvania on the third Sunday of November each year since 1954. The Philadelphia Marathon ranks among the top ten in the nation's largest marathons with over 30,000 runners, 60,000 spectators and 3,000 volunteers. The 30,000 runners come from all 50 states, the District of Columbia and over 42 countries.

History

The roots of the Philadelphia Marathon (aka the Philadelphia Independence Marathon and today known as the AACR Philadelphia Marathon) can be traced back to 1954, the race's unofficial inaugural year.  The marathon then largely was a suburban event and went by many different names; the Greater Philadelphia Independence Marathon (1981–82) and the Fairmount Park Marathon (1988–89).  The marathon today, was established under the name of the Philadelphia Marathon in 1994 under then Mayor Ed Rendell as an annual running event that took place entirely within the City of Philadelphia.

This yearly event takes place on the 3rd Sunday in November or “the Sunday before Thanksgiving”.  The Marathon is a top U.S. running event and top Boston qualifier with 30,000 runners participating in one or more of 7 featured events. Those events include, the AACR Philadelphia Marathon, Dietz & Watson Philadelphia Half Marathon, Rothman Orthopaedic 8K and four challenges where runners compete in completing multiple race combinations over two days. The Philadelphia Marathon Weekend has over 60,000 spectators and 3,000 volunteers who provide valuable race day support. Working along with volunteers from local schools, colleges and universities and the community actively participate to organize cheer zones, manage replenishment stations, monitor the course and provide support to help runners have their best possible runner experience while in the “City of Brotherly Love and Sisterly Affection”.

As a major City event, the Marathon is produced by the City of Philadelphia, Managing Director's Office.  In 1995,a group of dedicated runners and  Dr. Peter Sharkey of the Rothman Institute, a top Philadelphia orthopedic practice, sponsored a smaller running event as part of the Sunday Marathon event.  Now, 23 years and 3,000 runners later, the Rothman 8K is an integral part of Marathon Weekend and an enjoyable event for beginners or those who just want to run.  It is also for some, a warm-up for the longer distances.  In 2006, a half marathon was added to the Sunday line up by Janis Pierce, the City Representative at that time, and a runner and in 2016 the race moved to a two day event with the half marathon and 8K on Saturday and full marathon on Sunday.

In 2011, two competitors died, which were the first deaths to occur in the Philadelphia Marathon in over a decade.  The first was Jeffrey Lee, a 21-year-old Nursing and Wharton student attending the University of Pennsylvania. Having collapsed after crossing the finish line of an apparent heart attack, the cause of his death actually remains unknown. Although the cause of death was officially diagnosed as hypertrophic cardiomyopathy,  after further examination of the autopsy, it was concluded that the diagnosis may not have been accurate since the size of his heart would have been normal for an athlete. Therefore, medical professionals believe his death may have been caused by an underlying heart condition, not a heart attack.
The second death was of Chris Gleason, a 40-year-old experienced triathlete from Clifton Park, NY. Gleason collapsed a quarter-mile from the finish line from heart attack.

In 2013, Gore-Tex was announced to be the title sponsor for the next three years.

In 2017, American Association for Cancer Research (AACR) was announced to be the title sponsor for the next three years for the full marathon.

In 2017, Dietz & Watson was announced to be the official sponsor for the half marathon.

In 2017, the Rothman Institute agreed to continue its sponsorship of the 8K event. The Rothman Institute has been part of the Philadelphia Marathon for over 19 years, dating back to when Drs. Richard Rothman and Peter Sharkey began sponsoring the 8K as part of their community outreach efforts.

In 2017, Dunkin' Donuts was announced to be the official sponsor for the Dunkin' Munchkins Run.

In 2018, Garmin joined the team of sponsors for the Marathon, and was named the official timer and running watch for that year's marathon.

In 2020, the Marathon was cancelled after mayor Jim Kenney announced a moratorium on public gatherings of more than 50 people within the city of Philadelphia on July 14 due to the COVID-19 pandemic.  Registrants were given the option of either transferring their entry to 2021, 2022, or 2023, or obtaining a refund.

In 2021, the marathon was held under a restrictions that only vaccinated runners may participate in all events and the Dunkin Kids Fun Run was cancelled. The race had over 21,000 runners between in-person events and virtually.

Course 

The course begins and ends at the Philadelphia Museum of Art on the Benjamin Franklin Parkway. The Philadelphia Marathon course is relatively flat and offers a view of many historical landmarks that include Independence Hall, the Betsy Ross House and the Liberty Bell.  The course travels the streets of Old City on Penn's Landing, parallel to the Delaware River, along the Schuylkill River and out to Manayunk.  The highest elevation in the course is approximately 148 feet.  The terrain presents many uphill and downhill challenges for the runners, though the course itself is very flat compared to other large scale marathons.

Runner information

The event also serves as a qualifying race for entry into the Boston Marathon for participants whose times meet age group bracketed standards.  The race also features a state of the art timing system, using a small chip that attached to the back of each runner's bib that provides a 'chip time' for when the person has crossed the start and finish lines, as well as giving a traditional 'gun time'.

Health and Fitness Expo - Runners pick up their race packets that include a race bib, timing tag, T-shirt and bag at the free two-day health and fitness expo located in the Pennsylvania Convention Center.

Cheer Zones – Spectators can select from more than 20 cheer zones throughout the course to show support to the runners.

Transportation - Detours throughout parts of the city begin at 3AM and run until 1PM

Awards

Several cash prizes are awarded for the full marathon.
1st - $10,000 one male & one female (Course Record Bonus: $1,500, one male & one female for each)
2nd - $5,000 one male & one female
3rd - $2,500 one male & one female
1st - Masters - $1,000 one male & one female
1st - Philadelphian - $1,000 one male & one female (must be a resident of Philadelphia County, determined by ZIP code)
1st - Wheelchair - $1,000

All marathon runners receive a Philadelphia Marathon T-shirt, a Finisher Medal and a finisher certificate (available online after the race).

Other races

Dietz & Watson Philadelphia Half Marathon 

The Half Marathon was added to Race Weekend in 2006 and winds through Philadelphia's most scenic and historic neighborhoods. From the history-steeped streets of Old City, through one of the liveliest stretches of Center City, across the Schuylkill, up through the bucolic trails of Fairmount Park, and back down to canvas the banks of the river. The course is also sanctioned by USA Track & Field. Dietz and Watson is the current sponsor for the half-marathon portion of the Philadelphia Marathon weekend. Each runner receives a t-shirt, a finisher medal and a finisher certificate (available online after the race).

Rothman 8K 

The Rothman Orthopaedic sponsors an 8-km (about 5 miles) companion race to the Philadelphia Marathon. This race follows a shorter loop of the marathon, starting off on the expansive Benjamin Franklin Parkway before taking a turn on the scenic banks of the Schuylkill River and Martin Luther King Drive or Kelly Drive. Each runner receives a T-shirt, a finisher medal and a finisher certificate (available online after the race).

Environmental impact 

The AACR Philadelphia Marathon, who collaborated with the Mayor's Office of Civic Engagement to turn the race into an eco-friendly sporting event.

In 2007, the Marathon's eco-friendly events began with recycling paper, cardboard, plastics, food and medals. Each year the “going green” efforts continued.  Pallets were recycled, the Marathon partnered with the More Foundation by recycling sneakers to support families in Ghana, partnered with the Streets Department and began composting cups and organics and introduced the “Waste Watchers Volunteers” to facilitate on-site sorting. In 2012-2013, the Philadelphia Marathon received a Gold Certification from the Council of responsible Sport (ReSport) and organization that certifies special events for environmental sustainability and community engagement.  In 2014-15 the Marathon received Green Certification along with achieving Zero Waste (over 90% diversion waste from landfill).

Some of the sustainable initiatives include:

 Recycling heat sheets
 Collecting and donating outer layers of warm up clothes
 Recycling runners bags
 Composting cups
 Melting down and recycling excess runners medals

Winners

Winners by Country

Winners by Continent

See also
Broad Street Run
Philadelphia Distance Run
Sports in Philadelphia

References

External links
 PhiladelphiaMarathon.com - 'History is Alive and Running:  Philadelphia Marathon' (official website) 
 ARRS.run - 'Philadelphia Independence Marathon, Philadelphia PA/USA:  Race Winners' (through 59 editions)
 Kathleen Boyle Wrigley: Blind Runner-Philadelphia Marathon Biography
 2010 to 2017 results
 Results of past six years
 2005 results
 2004 results
 2003 results
 2002 results
 2001 results
 2000 results
 1998 results
 2017 Finisher Certificates
 Cheer zones
 
 
 

Recurring sporting events established in 1954
Culture of Philadelphia
Marathons in the United States
Sports in Philadelphia
Tourist attractions in Philadelphia